Joseph David Eaton (born 16 May 1931) is an English former professional footballer who played in the Football League for Mansfield Town.

References

1931 births
Living people
English footballers
Association football forwards
English Football League players
Mansfield Town F.C. players